Karl Forest (1874–1944) was an Austrian actor. He was married to the actress Traute Carlsen.

Selected filmography
 The Tales of Hoffmann (1923)
 The Money Devil (1923)
 Boarding House Groonen (1925)
 The Guardsman (1925)
 Der Rosenkavalier (1925)
 The Queen of Moulin Rouge (1926)
 Grandstand for General Staff (1926)
 Father Radetzky (1929)
 Little Veronica (1929)
 The Squeaker (1931)
 Die Fledermaus (1931)
 The Ringer (1932)
 Mamsell Nitouche (1932)
 Wehe, wenn er losgelassen (1932)
 Gently My Songs Entreat (1933)
 Asew (1935)
 Lumpaci the Vagabond (1936)
 Woman in the River (1939)
 Immortal Waltz (1939)

Bibliography
 Jung, Uli & Schatzberg, Walter. Beyond Caligari: The Films of Robert Wiene. Berghahn Books, 1999.

External links

1874 births
1944 deaths
Austrian male film actors
Austrian male stage actors
Austrian male silent film actors
Male actors from Vienna
20th-century Austrian male actors